Lauridae is a family of crustaceans belonging to the order Laurida.

Genera:
 Baccalaureus Broch, 1929
 Gorganolaureus Utinomi, 1962
 Laura Lacaze-Duthiers, 1865
 Polymarsypus Grygier, 1985
 Zoanthoecus Grygier, 1985

References

Crustacean families